Sol Negrin (February 16, 1929 – March 20, 2017) was an American cinematographer. He was nominated for five Primetime Emmy Awards in the category Outstanding Cinematography for his work on the television programs Kojak, Baker's Dozen and the television film The Last Tenant. Negrin was also honored in the American Society of Cinematographers for the President's Award. He died in March 2017, at the age of 88.

References

External links 

1929 births
2017 deaths
People from New York (state)
American cinematographers